Mangi Dam is located near Ziarat in Balochistan, Pakistan. It was constructed at a cost of US$36.88 million. It was made to stop the fish from leaving the fishing area. In 2015 it is announced that the dam will also produce electricity and the shortage of load shedding will also reduce.

Mangi Dam and Water Conveyance System Project

At an estimated cost Rs 9.85 billion would be launched in order to meet water supply requirement of Quetta city and adjoining areas. According to sources, the Ministry of Water and Power prepared the PC-1 of the project and referred it to the Ministry of Planning, Development and Reforms. The project envisages: (i) providing about 8.10 MGD for augmenting the existing under stress water requirements of Quetta Town, (ii) shifting the existing trend of extracting underground water by means of tube wells to more sustainable option of constructing the surface water storage reservoirs, (iii) providing un-interrupted drinking water supplies to the inhabitants of Quetta Town by means of Construction of Water Storage Tanks in Quetta Valley, (iv) uplifting the livelihood of inhabitants by providing employment and business opportunities during construction phase of the project, (v) mitigating the impacts of floods D/S of proposed Dam site. According to PC-1 of the project, the federal and Balochistan governments would share the cost of the project equally. The project would be completed within 36 months after its approval.

See also
 List of dams and reservoirs in Pakistan

Notes

Dams in Balochistan, Pakistan
Gwadar District
Dams completed in 1982
1982 establishments in Pakistan